The  Katherine M. Lee  is a sail-powered oyster schooner, built in 1912 at Greenwich, New Jersey.
oak. The rigging was removed in the 1940s, when the vessel was converted to diesel power. She is maintained and used for oyster dredging on the waters of the Delaware Bay.

She was listed on the National Register of Historic Places in 1983.

A similar oyster dredging schooner, the Maggie S. Myers which is also listed on the NRHP, was also docked near Front and Lombard streets in Leipsic, Delaware.

References

Schooners of the United States
Ships on the National Register of Historic Places in Delaware
National Register of Historic Places in Kent County, Delaware
Oyster schooners
Fishing ships of the United States
Ships built in New Jersey
Leipsic, Delaware